The Collection 1989–2003 is a thirteen-CD and five DVD box set by British recording artist Lisa Stansfield. It was released by Edsel Records in the United Kingdom on 10 November 2014 and in Europe on 21 November 2014. It includes five of Stansfield's studio albums and additionally many rare tracks, remixes, promo videos, live concert footage and new interviews. All albums were also released individually on the same date.

Content
This eighteen-disc box set brings together deluxe 2CD+DVD editions of Stansfield's albums recorded for Arista label: Affection (1989), Real Love (1991), So Natural (1993), Lisa Stansfield (1997) and Face Up (2001), plus the three-CD set People Hold On ... The Remix Anthology in a unique outer slipcase.

Track listing

Release history

References

2014 albums
Lisa Stansfield compilation albums
Disco compilation albums
Pop rock compilation albums